Malik Williams (born August 26, 1998) is an American basketball player for the Anwil Włocławek of the Polish Basketball League. He played college basketball for Louisville.

High school career
Williams played basketball for R. Nelson Snider High School in Fort Wayne, Indiana. As a senior, he averaged 21.5 points, 12.5 rebounds and four blocks per game, leading his team to its first Summit Athletic Conference title since 2009. Williams was one of four finalists for the Indiana Mr. Basketball award. He left as the program's all-time leader in rebounds and blocks.

Recruiting
Williams was considered a five-star recruit by 247Sports and ESPN, and a four-star recruit by Rivals. On August 4, 2016, he committed to playing college basketball for Louisville over offers from Purdue, Michigan State and Indiana, among others.

College career
As a freshman at Louisville, Williams averaged 3.8 points and 2.4 rebounds per game. On January 6, 2019, he posted a career-high 19 points and 11 rebounds in a 90–73 win against Miami (Florida). Williams averaged 7.7 points and 6.1 rebounds per game as a sophomore. He missed the first four games of his junior season after undergoing surgery for a broken foot. As a junior, Williams averaged 8.5 points and 6.1 rebounds per game, and was the runner-up for Atlantic Coast Conference Sixth Man of the Year. He was limited to three games in his senior season after reinjuring his foot twice. He returned to Louisville for his fifth season of eligibility, granted due to the COVID-19 pandemic. On February 1, 2022, Williams was indefinitely suspended due to failing to uphold program standards, but was reinstated on February 7 after missing two games.

Professional career

Anwil Włocławek (2023–present)
On January 1, 2023, he signed with Anwil Włocławek of the Polish Basketball League.

Career statistics

College

|-
| style="text-align:left;"| 2017–18
| style="text-align:left;"| Louisville
| 32 || 12 || 10.6 || .418 || .323 || .688 || 2.4 || .2 || .4 || .4 || 3.8
|-
| style="text-align:left;"| 2018–19
| style="text-align:left;"| Louisville
| 34 || 20 || 18.2 || .420 || .318 || .701 || 6.1 || .3 || .3 || 1.2 || 7.7
|-
| style="text-align:left;"| 2019–20
| style="text-align:left;"| Louisville
| 26 || 3 || 18.7 || .497 || .290 || .648 || 6.1 || .3 || .5 || .6 || 8.5
|-
| style="text-align:left;"| 2020–21
| style="text-align:left;"| Louisville
| 3 || 2 || 20.7 || .300 || .286 || .250 || 6.0 || 1.0 || .7 || .0 || 5.0
|- class="sortbottom"
| style="text-align:center;" colspan="2"| Career
| 95 || 37 || 15.8 || .439 || .314 || .667 || 4.9 || .3 || .4 || .7 || 6.5

Personal life
Williams wears the number 5 jersey and has a tattoo on his right forearm to honor his friend and former R. Nelson Snider High School girls basketball player, Peytin Chamble, who died in a car accident at age 17.

References

External links
Louisville Cardinals bio

1998 births
Living people
American men's basketball players
Basketball players from Fort Wayne, Indiana
Centers (basketball)
KK Włocławek players
Louisville Cardinals men's basketball players
Power forwards (basketball)